Peter Jonsson can refer to:

 Peter Jönsson (born 1965), Swedish footballer
 Peter Jonsson (cyclist) (born 1958), Swedish cyclist
 Peter Jonsson (politician) (born 1962), Swedish politician, member of the Riksdag since 2002